Money, Women and Guns is a 1958 American Western film directed by Richard Bartlett and written by Montgomery Pittman. The film stars Jock Mahoney, Kim Hunter, Tim Hovey, Gene Evans, Tom Drake, Lon Chaney Jr., William Campbell, Jeffrey Stone, James Gleason, Judi Meredith, and Phillip Terry. The film was released in October 1958, by Universal Pictures.

Plot
After a gold prospector is killed by masked robbers, a detective is hired to find the surviving killer as well as the prospector's legal inheritors.

Cast

Production notes
According to the AFI Catalog, although it was filmed in September 1957, its release was delayed for over a year. The song, "Lonely Is The Hunter," written and performed during the opening credits by Jimmy Wakely, suggests that it may have been a working title, and the final one a last-minute change—and a somewhat inaccurate one, as there are only two women in the film and neither has a significant role.

The following year, Pittman and Horwitz were reunited on the television series 77 Sunset Strip.

The film is noteworthy as Chaney's last film for the studio that helped make him a star 17 years earlier.

References

External links

1958 films
American Western (genre) films
1958 Western (genre) films
Films directed by Richard Bartlett
Films scored by Herman Stein
Universal Pictures films
1950s English-language films
1950s American films